Budy Ossowskie massacre was a mass murder of ethnic Poles carried out on 29–30 August 1943 by a death squad of the Ukrainian Insurgent Army aided by the Ukrainian peasants during the Massacres of Poles in Volhynia and Eastern Galicia. About 290 people were killed, including women and children, all of them, Polish inhabitants of the Budy Ossowskie village, located in the Kowel County (powiat kowelski) of the Wołyń Voivodeship in the Second Polish Republic (now, part of the Kovel Raion, south-west of Kovel, Ukraine). Budy Ossowskie village does not exist anymore. It was burned to the ground by the OUN-UPA. The charred remnants of the village were cleared in Soviet Ukraine for grazing cattle. Overall, in the Kowel County some 7,300 ethnic Poles were murdered.

References

 

1943 crimes in Poland
1943 in Ukraine
August 1943 events
Massacres in 1943
Massacres in Poland
Massacres in Ukraine
War crimes committed by the Ukrainian Insurgent Army
Massacres of Poles in Volhynia